The Ring and the Man is a lost 1914 silent dramatic film directed by Francis Powers and starring Bruce McRae. It was produced by Famous Players Film Company and released on State Rights basis.

Cast
Bruce McRae - George Gormly, alias for George fordyce
Wellington Playter - William Haldane
Violet Horner - Eleanor Haldane
Helen Aubrey - Mrs. Jim Martin
Robert Broderick - Jim Martin
Albert Andruss - Chief of Police
Charles Douglass (actor) - The Sheriff
Albert S. Houston - Fordyce's Secretary

References

External links
The Ring and the Man at IMDb.com

1914 films
American silent feature films
Lost American films
Famous Players-Lasky films
American black-and-white films
Silent American drama films
1914 drama films
1914 lost films
Lost drama films
1910s American films
1910s English-language films
English-language drama films